Rivers State is the sixth-largest geographic area in Nigeria according to 2006 census data. The state has an indigenously diverse population with major riverine and upland divisions. The dominant ethnic groups are: Ogoni, Ijaw and Ikwerre. Upland Rivers State covering about 45% is composed mainly of Ogoni and Ikwerre, although there are many other minority people in the region. The riverine, including most of the state's towns and villages surrounded by water is moderately inhabited. It covers approximately 39% of the total land mass and holds a significant Ijaw population.

This list refers to the various autochthonous ethnic groups residing within Rivers State's boundaries in addition to its upland and riverine areas.

Abua
Asa
Andoni
Babbe
Bille
Bolo
Degema
Ekpeye
Eleme
Engenni
Etche
Gokana
Ibani
Ikwerre
Igbo
Kalabari
Khana
Kula
Ndoni
 
Nkoro
Nkoroo
Ndoki
Ogba
Ogu
Egbema
Okrika
Saro

References

I
Rivers State
Indigenous peoples